McCallie Rocks are two rocks located in the sea about  off the coast of Antarctica in the Vestfold Hills region. They are named after Michael McCallie, a helicopter pilot, who flew survey parties around the Vestfold Hills in 1978–79 in an exemplary manner and made the first landings by air on the rocks. Survey station NM/S/267 was established there in January 1979.
  
Survey station NM/S/271 lies on a true bearing of 11° 47′ distant  from survey station NM/S/267.

These rocks form part of an extensive network of Adelie penguin breeding rookeries along the ice-free rock areas of the Ingrid Christensen Coast, Princess Elizabeth Land.

This name originates from Australia. It is part of the Australian Antarctic Gazetteer (ID number 2457) and the SCAR Composite Gazetteer of Antarctica (ID number 9214).

References 

Islands of Princess Elizabeth Land